Kentucky Thunder is the tenth studio album by American country music artist Ricky Skaggs. It was released in 1989 via Epic Records. The album peaked at number 18 on the Billboard Top Country Albums chart.

Track listing
"Hummingbird" (Tim DuBois, Greg Jennings) – 3:08
"Lovin' Only Me" (Hillary Kanter, Even Stevens) – 3:33
"The Fields of Home" (Larry Cordle, Larry Shell) – 3:56
"Heartbreak Hurricane" (Cordle, Jim Rushing) – 2:37
"Let It Be You" (Harry Stinson, Kevin Welch) – 2:41
"Lonesome for You" (Cordle, Shell) – 2:21
"Kentucky Thunder" (Cordle, Rushing) – 2:55
"When I Love" (Paul Overstreet, Don Schlitz) – 3:02
"He Was On to Somethin' (So He Made You)" (Sonny Curtis) – 2:37
"Casting My Shadow in the Road" (Rushing, Randy Scruggs) – 3:34
"Saviour, Save Me from Myself" (Cordle, Rushing) – 2:30

Personnel 
 Ricky Skaggs – lead vocals, backing vocals (1-4, 6-10), mandolin (1, 4, 5, 7, 8, 9), acoustic guitar (2, 4, 5, 7, 10), fiddle (9), triangle (9)
 Barry Beckett – acoustic piano (1, 2, 3, 6, 7, 8)
 Shane Keister – acoustic piano (4, 9)
 Joey Miskulin – accordion (9)
 Mark Casstevens – acoustic guitar (1, 2, 3, 6-10)
 Mac McAnally – acoustic guitar (1, 3, 4, 6)
 Albert Lee – electric lead guitar (1, 2, 6)
 Steve Gibson – electric guitar, mandolin (2)
 Terry Crisp – steel guitar (3)
 Lloyd Green – steel guitar (5, 8, 9, 10)
 Béla Fleck – banjo (4, 7)
 Jerry Douglas – dobro (5, 6, 7)
 David Hungate – bass guitar (1-8, 10)
 Roy Huskey Jr. – upright bass (1, 2, 4)
 Larry Paxton – bass guitar (9)
 Eddie Bayers – drums 
 Stuart Duncan – fiddle (1, 3-6, 10)
 Bobby Hicks – fiddle (7)
 Dennis Wilson – backing vocals (5)
 Curtis Young – backing vocals (5)

Production 
 Steve Buckingham – producer 
 Ricky Skaggs – producer 
 John Abbott – engineer
 Joe Bogan – engineer 
 Rodney Good – engineer 
 Patrick Hutchinson – engineer 
 John Hurley – engineer 
 Doug Johnson – engineer, mixing (2)
 Brad Jones – engineer 
 Kyle Lehning – engineer 
 George Massenberg – engineer, mixing (1, 3-10)
 Pat McMakin – engineer 
 Gary Paczosa – electric 
 Mike Poole – engineer 
 Dennis Ritchie – engineer 
 Ed Seay – engineer 
 Denny Purcell – mastering at Georgetown Masters (Nashville, Tennessee)
 Bill Johnson – art direction 
 Rollow Welch – art assistance
 Michael Rutherford – photography
 Earl Cox – hair stylist 
 Elizabeth Linamen – make-up
 Ricky Skaggs Enterprises – management

Charts

Weekly charts

Year-end charts

References

1989 albums
Ricky Skaggs albums
Albums produced by Steve Buckingham (record producer)
Epic Records albums
Albums produced by Ricky Skaggs